Isabella was a 179-ton merchant ship built in Redbridge, England, in 1823. She made one voyage transporting convicts from Mauritius to Australia.

Career
Isabella appears in the Register of Shipping with Maughan as master and owner, and with trade London to Hamburg.

Isabella, under the command of George Maughan left Cowes, Isle of Wight on 21 February 1833 with a general cargo and arrived at Cockburn Sound, Western Australia, on 24 July 1833.

She left Mauritius on 25 February 1837 with two military convicts and cargo. She sailed via Hobart Town on 22 April arriving at Sydney on 6 May. No convicts died on the voyage.

Isabella sailed from Sydney for London, under the command of Captain Ryan, on 6 March 1838, with passengers and cargo. A "piratical brig" under a Spanish flag boarded her on 4 July and took a new main-top-sail, a cask of beef, and various other articles. Isabella then arrived safely at Torbay.

She is last listed in Lloyds Register in 1856 with E.S. Lyle, master, and T.S.Atkins, owner, and no trade.

Citations

1823 ships
Ships built in Southampton
Convict ships to New South Wales
Age of Sail merchant ships
Merchant ships of the United Kingdom